John Cynn (born December 24, 1984) is an American professional poker player from Northbrook, Illinois. In 2018, he won the World Series of Poker (WSOP) Main Event for $8,800,000.

Cynn graduated from Indiana University Bloomington, where he studied finance and supply chain management. Prior to his poker career, he worked as an IT consultant in California. His first cash in a poker tournament came in 2010, while he first cashed in a WSOP event in 2012. In 2016, he finished 11th in the Main Event, earning $650,000. He had 12 WSOP cashes before the 2018 Main Event and three on the World Poker Tour, including a 10th-place finish at the L.A. Poker Classic in 2017.

At the 2018 Main Event, Cynn prevailed over a field of 7,874 players, the second-largest in WSOP history at that time.

As of 2018, his total live tournament winnings exceed $9.7 million. His 13 cashes at the WSOP account for $9.5 million of those winnings.

World Series of Poker bracelets

References

1984 births
Living people
American poker players
World Series of Poker Main Event winners
World Series of Poker bracelet winners
Indiana University Bloomington alumni
People from Indianapolis
Place of birth missing (living people)